John Phillip Law (September 7, 1937 – May 13, 2008) was an American film actor. 
 
Following a breakthrough role as a Russian sailor in The Russians Are Coming, the Russians Are Coming (1966), Law became best known for his roles as gunfighter Bill Meceita in the Spaghetti Western Death Rides a Horse (1967) with Lee Van Cleef, the blind angel Pygar in the science fiction film Barbarella (1968) with Jane Fonda, the title character in the action film Danger: Diabolik (1968), Manfred von Richthofen in Von Richthofen and Brown (1971), and news anchor Robin Stone in The Love Machine (1971). The latter reteamed him with Alexandra Hay, his co-star from the 1968 "acid comedy" Skidoo.

Early years
Law was born in Los Angeles, California, the son of Los Angeles County Deputy Sheriff John Law and actress Phyllis Sallee.  He was the brother of actor Thomas Augustus Law (also known as Tom Law). He graduated from Hollywood High School.

His mother got him work as a film extra as a child, and had a non-speaking role as a courtroom page in  The Magnificent Yankee (1950), directed by John Sturges.

He attended an engineering college in California then switched to the University of Hawaii where he studied psychology and appeared in several university stage productions. This caused him to decide to become an actor professionally.

Career

Lincoln Center and Italy
After graduation, Law moved to New York, where he studied acting and he signed a seven-year contract with Fox. He realised it was a mistake and got out of it, then returned to New York. He had a small role in Garson Kanin's unsuccessful Broadway comedy, Come On Strong (1962).

He auditioned for the Repertory Theater at the Lincoln Center, and was one of 12 picked out of 30,000. He stayed there for three years. Law was announced as part of the company in January 1964. He was in their productions of Marco's Millions, The Changeling directed by Elia Kazan with Faye Dunaway, and Tartuffe (1965).

He left the Lincoln Center company and traveled to Europe where he acted in High Infidelity (1964) and 3 notti d'amore (1964).

Early Hollywood films
One of Law's Italian films was seen by the director Norman Jewison, who thought Law perfect for the role of a young Soviet sailor in The Russians Are Coming, the Russians Are Coming (1966). The film was a big success and Law was launched in Hollywood.  He followed this with a co-star role in Otto Preminger's Hurry Sundown (1967), a drama about race relations in the south, which starred Jane Fonda and Michael Caine. Faye Dunaway played his wife in her first film role.

Stardom
Fonda was going to star in Barbarella and recommended Law for the film. Production was delayed so Law  played the lead in a Spaghetti Western, Death Rides a Horse (1967) with Lee Van Cleef, then the title role of Danger: Diabolik (1968), directed by Mario Bava and produced by Dino De Laurentiis.

Law eventually played the angel in Barbarella (1968), co starring with Jane Fonda and produced by De Laurentiis.
He followed this with a small role in Preminger's Skidoo (1968), then had the lead in The Sergeant (1968), starring Rod Steiger as a soldier who lusts after Law. He turned down roles in Midnight Cowboy and Easy Rider and was replaced when filming The Gypsy Moths.

Law went back to Europe to support Claudia Cardinale in a comedy, Diary of a Telephone Operator (1969). He had a key role in Hollywood's The Hawaiians (1970) with Charlton Heston and played the title role in the Italian Strogoff (1970), based on the novel by Jules Verne, Michael Strogoff.
[[File:John Phillip Law.png|thumb|Law in Von Richthofen and Brown]]
Law co-starred in Roger Corman's film Von Richthofen and Brown (1971), playing Manfred von Richthofen opposite Don Stroud's Roy Brown. Corman used Lynn Garrison's Irish aviation facility, complete with replica World War I aircraft. Garrison taught Law the basics of flying so that he could take off and land, making some of the footage more realistic.

Law received top-billing in The Love Machine (1971), based on the novel by Jacqueline Susann, replacing Brian Kelly at the last moment. He was one of many actors to have a cameo in The Last Movie (1970). He supported Monica Vitti and Alberto Sordi in Polvere di stelle (1973) then had the title role in The Golden Voyage of Sinbad (1973). He co-starred with Peter Fonda in Open Season (1974) and was in the TV remake of The Spiral Staircase (1975).

European stardom
Law could still command star roles in Europe: he was in Doctor Justice (1975), A Whisper in the Dark (1976) and Tu dios y mi infierno (1976). He had a support role in The Cassandra Crossing (1977) and supported Anthony Quinn in Target of an Assassin (1977), filmed in South Africa.

Law was top-billed in Eyes Behind the Wall (1977), The Rider on the White Horse (1978), and The Devil's Bed (1978). He returned to Hollywood to play a supporting role in The Best Place to Be and Ring of Darkness (both 1979).

1980s onward
Law went to Taiwan to make two films, Yuan (1980) and Attack Force Z (1981), an Australian-Taiwanese co-production. He appeared in Tarzan the Ape Man (1981), and made guest appearances on the TV shows The Love Boat and Murder, She Wrote.

Law remained in demand, albeit mostly now in low-budget films, including Tin Man (1983), Night Train to Terror (1985), American Commandos (1985), Moon in Scorpio (1987),  Thunder III (1987), Striker (1987), Una grande storia d'amore (1988), Space Mutiny (1988), Blood Delirium (1988), A Case of Honor (1989), and Cold Heat (1989).

Law appeared in Alienator (1990), Shining Blood (1992), Il giorno del porco (1993), The Mountain of the Lord (1993), Hindsight (1996), My Ghost Dog (1997), Wanted (1999), and Bad Guys (2000). In 2001, he appeared in Roman Coppola's directorial debut CQ, an homage to the Italian spy/sci-fi B-movies in which Law often starred during the 1960s. His final roles included Curse of the Forty-Niner (2002) (which he also associate produced), The Three Faces of Terror (2004), and Ray of Sunshine (2006). His last credited film role was in 2008's .Personal life
He married and later divorced actress Shawn Ryan, with whom he had a daughter.

Death
On December 13, 2007, his doctors diagnosed Law with pancreatic cancer. He died five months later on May 13, 2008, at his home in Los Angeles.

Selected filmography

 1950 The Magnificent Yankee as Minor Role (scenes deleted)
 1951 Show Boat as Extra (uncredited)
 1962 Smog (uncredited)
 1964 High Infidelity as Ronald (segment "Scandaloso")
 1964 Three Nights of Love as Fra Felice (segment "Fatebenefratelli")
 1966 The Russians Are Coming, the Russians Are Coming as Alexei Kolchin
 1967 Hurry Sundown as Rad McDowell
 1967 Death Rides a Horse as Bill Meceita
 1967 Her Harem (uncredited)
 1968 Danger: Diabolik as Diabolik
 1968 Barbarella as Pygar, The Blind Angel
 1968 Skidoo as "Stash"
 1968 The Sergeant as Private First Class Tom Swanson
 1969 Diary of a Telephone Operator as Crispino
 1970 The Hawaiians as Noel Hoxworth
 1970 Strogoff as Michael Strogoff
 1971 Von Richthofen and Brown as Manfred von Richthofen, the Red Baron
 1971 The Love Machine as Robin Stone
 1971 The Last Movie as Little Brother
 1973 Stardust as John
 1973 The Golden Voyage of Sinbad as Sinbad the Sailor
 1974 Open Season as Greg Anderson
 1975 The Spiral Staircase as Steven Sherman
 1975  as Dr. Benjamin Justice
 1976 A Whisper in the Dark as Alex
 1976 Your Heaven, My Hell as Martín
 1976 The Cassandra Crossing as Major Stark
 1976 Target of an Assassin as Shannon
 1977 Eyes Behind the Wall as Arturo
 1978 The Rider on the White Horse as Hauke Haien
 1978 The Devil's Bed as John Vanetti
 1979 The Best Place to Be as Dr. Gary Mancini
 1979 Ring of Darkness as The Exorcist
 1980 The Pioneers as A.P. Karns
 1981 Attack Force Z as Lieutenant Jan Veitch
 1981 Tarzan, the Ape Man as Harry Holt
 1983 Tin Man as Dr. Edison
 1984  as Ted Barner
 1985 Night Train to Terror as Harry Billings (segment "The Case of Harry Billings")
 1985 American Commandos as Kelly
 1985 Rainy Day Friends as Dr. Stephen Kendrick
 1987  as Maximilian Steiner
 1987 Moon in Scorpio as Allen
 1987 Colpo di stato as Shaw
 1988 Thunder Warrior III as Sheriff Jeff
 1988 Striker as Frank Morris
 1988 Space Mutiny as Flight Commander Elijah Kalgan
 1988 Blood Delirium as Saint Simon
 1989 A Case of Honor as Captain Roger L. Barnes
 1989 Cold Heat as R.C. Mallon
 1989 Nerds of a Feather (uncredited)
 1989 The Young & the Restless as Dr. Jim Grainger
 1990 Alienator as Ward Armstrong
 1990 Little Women of Today as Tycoon
 1991 Alaska Stories as Aristocratic Con Man
 1992 Marilyn Alive and Behind Bars as Harry Billings
 1992 Day of the Pig as Azazel
 1992 Europa Mission as Colonel Ferri
 1992 Shining Blood as "Heep", Ranch Foreman
 1993 The Mountain of the Lord as Brigham Young
 1993 Angel Eyes as Steven Fox
 1995 Brennendes Herz as Böhme
 1996 Hindsight as Vincent, Joanne's Husband
 1998 My Magic Dog (TV Movie) as Peter Avelino
 1999 Wanted as Pursuing Rider
 2000 Bad Guys as Sheriff
 2001 CQ as The Chairman
 2002 Curse of the Forty-Niner as Sheriff Murphy
 2004 The Three Faces of Terror as Professor Peter Price
 2006 Ray of Sunshine 2008 I Am Somebody: No Chance in Hell a.k.a. Chinaman's Chance as Foreman Dan
 2012 L'apocalisse delle scimmie''

References

External links 

1937 births
2008 deaths
American male film actors
American male stage actors
American male television actors
Male actors from Hollywood, Los Angeles
Male Spaghetti Western actors
Deaths from cancer in California
Deaths from pancreatic cancer
20th-century American male actors